The Perth Inferno is an ice hockey team in the Australian Women's Ice Hockey League (AWIHL). They play in Perth, Western Australia, at the Cockburn Ice Arena. Originally founded by Ice Hockey WA in 2016 as the Western Australian (WA) State Women’s Team, they team joined the AWIHL as an expansion team for the 2018–19 and renamed as the Perth Inferno.

Players

2019–20 Roster 
In August 2019, the Perth Inferno released the following roster for the 2019–20 AWIHL season. New players to the team included Sydney Fricker (WA Blaze), Heather Hayduk (WA Blaze), Rachel Kogiopoulos, Celeste Milner, Mariam Hall (WA Blaze), Molly Lukowiak and Sara Sammons. Dropped from the roster were Celestine Adams, Keesha Atkins, Taylor Cookson, Katrina Dobo, Melissa Jetten, Ella Licari, Cara Minney-Smith, Shelley Pippo-Giuffre, Courtney Poole, Madison Poole and Tansy Thomas-Bland.

Leadership and coaching

Broadcasting 
For the 2019–20 season, Perth Inferno games were broadcast on Kayo Sports, including games of the week, 20 minutes of highlights with commentary, and player interviews.

Games are also broadcast live on the Ice Hockey Australia website.

See also
 Australian Women's Ice Hockey League
 Ice Hockey Australia

References

External links
 
 Australian Womens Ice Hockey League
 Link to live game broadcast
  Ice Hockey Australia

Women's ice hockey in Australia
Ice hockey clubs established in 2016
Sporting clubs in Perth, Western Australia
2005 establishments in Australia
Ice hockey teams in Australia
Women's sports teams in Australia
Women's ice hockey teams
Australian Women's Ice Hockey League